The 2017 Women's European Union Amateur Boxing Championships were held in Cascia, Italy from 4 to 12 August 2017. This was the 8th edition of this competition organised by the European governing body for amateur boxing, the European Boxing Confederation (EUBC).

Medal table

Medal winners

Participating nations

90 competitors from 19 nations participated.

References

2017 Women's European Union Amateur Boxing Championships
Women's European Union Amateur Boxing Championships
International boxing competitions hosted by Italy
Women's Boxing